Kavacık can refer to the following villages in Turkey:

 Kavacık, Bayburt
 Kavacık, Beykoz, Istanbul
 Kavacık, Bucak
 Kavacık, Burdur
 Kavacık, Çorum
 Kavacık, Dursunbey
 Kavacık, Gerede
 Kavacık, Kemaliye
 Kavacık, Mengen
 Kavacık, Nazilli
 Kavacık, Yenipazar